Reset (Chinese: 开端) is a 2022 Chinese time-travel/whodunit streaming television series based on a novel by Qidaojun directed by Sun Molong and Liu Hongyuan. It tells the story of a college student Li Shiqing (Zhao Jinmai) and a video game designer Xiao Heyun (Bai Jingting) who are trapped in a time loop on a soon-to-explode bus.

This drama will premiere on Tencent Video on January 11, 2022. The Republic of China will be followed up on LINE TV from the same day, and Viki has followed up. In 2022, it will be on the TrueID platform in Thailand, Korea Asia N, A+Drama, Hong Kong MyTV SUPER aired, and Netflix launched in the Republic of China, Singapore, Vietnam, Malaysia, and Brunei.

Broadcast time

Synopsis
After repeatedly finding herself dying in an explosion while riding the same bus, Li Shiqing finally concludes that she is stuck in a never-ending time loop. Inadvertently, she drags fellow passenger Xiao Heyun into her loop. They then realize that there are chances to disembark from the bus and avoid the explosion. They also discover that calling the police is counterproductive and leads to being interrogated as suspects instead of being able to avert the disaster. Taking the matter into their own hands, they pair up to find the dangerous bomber on the bus.

Xiao Heyun and Li Shiqing are just two ordinary people who lack the halo of the protagonist and slowly realize self-growth after experiencing life and death challenges time and time again. While constantly going through time loops and seeking the truth, they also reflected contemporary social phenomena from the identities and experiences of the passengers on the bus, discussed bipolar topics about human nature and reality, and re-realized the meaning of life.

Cast

Main Character

Bus No. 45 
No. 45 bus license plate number - Jia A77651.

Jialin Public Security Bureau

Other Characters

Release 
The first episode aired on Tencent Video on 11 January 2022; by 23 January 2022 its first 13 episodes have surpassed 1 billion total views on the platform. In Taiwan the first episode debuted on 12 January 2022 on Line TV. In Thailand the series began airing on 19 January 2022 on TrueID.

Reception 
Its popularity has led to much discussion in China on social topics such as social responsibility and cyberbullying. International reception has also been overwhelmingly positive.
It has a score of 7.9 (610k) on Douban and 8.1 on IMDb.

TV drama songs

References

External links

2022 Chinese television series debuts
Chinese science fiction television series
2022 web series debuts
Television series by Tencent Penguin Pictures